Engine House No. 18 may refer to:

Engine House No. 18 (Detroit)
Engine House No. 18 (Los Angeles, California)

See also
 Engine House (disambiguation)